Ilha da Moela Lighthouse is an active lighthouse on the namesake island  from Ponta do Munduba at the entrance of Santos Bay, Brazil. Ilha da Moela Lighthouse is the oldest lighthouse on the State of São Paulo coast and the entire island is a Brazilian Navy base.

History
A new torch was installed in 1862 to accommodate a new 1st order of Fresnel lens built by BBT.

In 1953 the lighthouse underwent restoration works; the lantern was equipped with four focus lenses and four common lenses: two white and two red each. The lighthouse is managed by Brazilian Navy and is identified by the country code number BR-3288.

See also
List of lighthouses in Brazil

References

External links
  Centro de Sinalização Náutica Almirante Moraes Rego
 Picture of the lighthouse

Lighthouses in Brazil